Ajay Rathnam is an Indian actor who has worked predominantly in Tamil films and serials. He is known for his supporting and negative roles and has acted in over 300 movies. Standing at 6 ft 4 in (193 cm), Rathnam is one of the tallest actors in Kollywood.

Career
Rathnam made his acting debut with the horror film Naalai Manithan (1989) in which he played a monster. He has appeared in one episode of the TV serial Marmadesam (Vidathu Karuppu). He played the leader of the fictional LTF rebels in the Hindi-language film Madras Cafe (2013). His character bore a close resemblance to the late LTTE leader Velupillai Prabhakaran.

Other works
His other side is seen as a motivational trainer and has transformed lives of thousands of children under his academy "STONE TO DIAMOND".
Rathnam has been an abettor conducting motivational seminars for the students at various colleges. In 2018, he launched his badminton academy named "V Square" in Chennai. In 2019, he launched "V Square" Sports Arena in Mogappair.

Personal life
His son Dheeraj Vishnu Rathnam is also an actor who made his debut with Arivazhagan's Aarathu Sinam (2016).

Filmography

Television

References

External links 
 

Living people
Tamil male television actors
Tamil male actors
Male actors in Malayalam cinema
Indian male film actors
Male actors in Tamil cinema
20th-century Indian male actors
21st-century Indian male actors
Indian male television actors
1958 births